Hu Haiyan (born 1956) is president of Beijing Institute of Technology. He is a fellow of the Chinese Academy of Science and a leading scientist in mechanics.

Biography
He graduated with PhD from the Nanjing Aeronautics and Astronautics University. He was a researcher at the University of Stuttgart from 1992 to 1994. He was a visiting professor at Duke University from 1996 to 1997. He previously served as president of the Nanjing Aeronautics and Astronautics University. He was appointed as president of Beijing Institute of Technology in 2007.

External links
 Introduction from BIT's website 

1956 births
Living people
Academic staff of Beijing Institute of Technology
Educators from Shanghai
Members of the Chinese Academy of Sciences
Nanjing University of Aeronautics and Astronautics alumni
Presidents of Nanjing University of Aeronautics and Astronautics
Presidents of Beijing Institute of Technology
Scientists from Shanghai
TWAS fellows